The following lists events that happened during 2004 in the Democratic Republic of the Congo.

Incumbents 
 President: Joseph Kabila
 Prime Minister: Vacant

Events

The 2004 Money Laundering Act made money laundering and financing terror illegal and mandated a financial intelligence unit and cooperation with African and European law enforcement.

September
State-owned Gécamines signs an agreement with Global Enterprises Corporate (GEC), a company formed by the merger of Dan Gertler International (DGI) with Beny Steinmetz Global, to rehabilitate and operate the Kananga and Tilwezembe copper mines. The deal was ratified by presidential decree.

References

 
2000s in the Democratic Republic of the Congo
Years of the 21st century in the Democratic Republic of the Congo
Democratic Republic of the Congo
Democratic Republic of the Congo